Bahraich district is one of the districts of Uttar Pradesh state of India, and Bahraich town is the district headquarters. Bahraich District is a part of Devipatan Division.

History

According to some other historians in the middle age this place was the capital of “Bhar” dynasty. Therefore, it was called as “Bharaich”. Which later come to be known as “Bahraich”.

Famous Chinese visitors Hwaintsang and Feighyaan visited this place. The famous Arab visitor Ibne-ba-tuta visited Bahraich and wrote that Bahraich is a beautiful city situated at the bank of holy river Saryu.

According to Puraans King Luv, the son of God Ram and King Prasenjit ruled Bahraich. Also during the period of exile Pandavas and along with mother Kunti visited this place.

The guru of Maharaja Janak, Rishi Ashtwakra used to live here. Rishi Valmiki and Rishi Balark also used to live here .

Bahraich district is a part of Devipatan division consist of districts Bahraich, Gonda, Shravasti, Balrampur. You can find more than 50 famous Hindu Temple in bahraich district.

Geography
Bahraich borders Nepal districts Bardiya to the northwest and Banke to the northeast.  The rest of Bahraich is surrounded by following districts in Uttar Pradesh: Lakhimpur and Sitapur on the west, Barabanki to the southwest, Gonda to the southeast, and Shravasti to the east.

District Jail
District Jail Bahraich situated beside Indira Stadium on Jail Road, also known as Police Line Road. This jail is operated since year 1848.

Economy
In 2006 the Ministry of Panchayati Raj named Bahraich one of the country's 250 most backward districts (out of a total of 640). It is one of the 34 districts in Uttar Pradesh currently receiving funds from the Backward Regions Grant Fund Programme (BRGF).

Demographics

According to the 2011 census Bahraich district has a population of 3,487,731, This gives it a ranking of 89th in India (out of a total of 640). Its population growth rate over the decade 2001–2011 was 46.08%. Bahraich has a sex ratio of 891 females for every 1000 males, and a literacy rate of 49.32%. Scheduled Castes and Scheduled Tribes made up 14.60% and 0.32% of the population respectively.

Bahraich is a category "A" district i.e. having socio-economic and basic amenities parameters below the national average.

Hindus are the majority population, but Muslims are a large minority. In urban areas Muslims are the majority.

At the time of the 2011 Census of India, 89.36% of the population in the district spoke Hindi, 7.02% Urdu, 1.82% Awadhi and 1.49% Bhojpuri as their first language.

Tehsil 
Bahraich district comprises 6 tehsils or sub-divisions, each headed by a Sub-Divisional Magistrate (SDM):

 Bahraich 
 Kaisarganj
 Nanpara
 Payagpur
 Motipur (Mihinpurwa)
 Mahsi

References

External links

 

 
Districts of Uttar Pradesh
Minority Concentrated Districts in India